The 1940 Tennessee Volunteers represented the University of Tennessee in the 1940 college football season. Playing as a member of the Southeastern Conference (SEC), the team was led by head coach Robert Neyland, in his 14th year, and played their home games at Shields–Watkins Field in Knoxville, Tennessee. They finished the season with a record of ten wins and one loss (10–1 overall, 5–0 in the SEC), as SEC champions and with a loss against Boston College in the 1941 Sugar Bowl.

This team won the school's second national championship after being recognized as national champion under the Dunkel System, a power index system devised by Dick Dunkel, Sr.

Schedule

References

Tennessee
Tennessee Volunteers football seasons
College football national champions
Southeastern Conference football champion seasons
Tennessee Volunteers football